Phồn Xương is a township (thị trấn) and capital of Yên Thế District, Bắc Giang Province, in northeastern Vietnam. The township is known as the place where the Yên Thế Insurrection began.

References

Populated places in Bắc Giang province
Communes of Bắc Giang province
District capitals in Vietnam
Townships in Vietnam